Bruno Podalydès (born 11 March 1961) is a French writer, film director, producer and actor. His brother Denis Podalydès is also an actor.

Selected filmography

References

External links
 

1961 births
Living people
People from Versailles
21st-century French male actors
French film directors

French male film actors
20th-century French male actors
French male screenwriters
French screenwriters
French film producers